Bonney is a surname, and may refer to:

 Anne Bonny, female pirate
 Barbara Bonney
 Charles Bonney
 Frederic Bonney, English anthropologist and photographer in Australia
 Josiah H. Bonney, American politician
 John Bonney, Australian rules footballer
 Leonard Warden Bonney, pioneer aviator
 Mary Bonney, American educator
 Maude Bonney, Australian aviator
 Michael Bonney, American businessman
 Richard Bonney, English historian and priest
 Richard Bonney (footballer), former manager of Portsmouth F.C.
 Sean Bonney, English poet
 Simon Bonney
 Tabi Bonney, hip-hop artist 
 Thérèse Bonney
 Thomas George Bonney, (1833–1923), geologist
 William H. Bonney, alias of American outlaw Billy the Kid